Lithocarpus meijeri is a tree in the beech family Fagaceae. It is named for the Dutch botanist Willem Meijer.

Description
The reddish brown to greyish bark is smooth or fissured or scaly.

Distribution and habitat
Lithocarpus meijeri grows naturally in Peninsular Malaysia and Borneo. Its habitat is mixed dipterocarp forest, including kerangas forest, to  altitude.

References

meijeri
Flora of Peninsular Malaysia
Flora of Borneo
Plants described in 1970